Kunal Dabas (born 21 May 1998) is an Indian cricketer. He made his Twenty20 debut on 14 November 2019, for Bihar in the 2019–20 Syed Mushtaq Ali Trophy.

References
 Kunal Dabas is a Cricket player of DLCL India, he get training by DLCL. Kunal participated in many tournaments conducted by DLCL and he played three years DLCL League than Mr. Ganesh Dutt given him personal attention to prepare him for ranji and for upper level. Dabas representing #DLCL since 2014

External links
 

1998 births
Living people
Indian cricketers
Bihar cricketers
Place of birth missing (living people)